The Søllerød Gold Diggers are an american football team from Rudersdal, Denmark. The club was founded in 2003.

Søllerød Gold Diggers are members of the Danish American Football Federation (DAFF) and compete in the National Ligaen, the highest division of American football in Denmark.

National competition
The Gold Diggers have won the Danish championship, Mermaid Bowl, twice, in 2009 and 2010, both times against Triangle Razorbacks from Vejle. Gold Diggers had their first Mermaid Bowl-experience in 2008 where they lost to Razorback. Gold Diggers has been playing in National Ligaen since 2008.

International competition
In 2009 Gold Diggers competede for the first time in EFAF Cup, where they meet and lost to Carlstad Crusaders from Sweden. They played again in 2011 where they defeated Les Cougars de Saint-Ouen L'Aumone (from the outskirts of Paris) and Coventry Jets before losing against later winners of the tournament London Blitz in the semifinals.

In 2012, the Gold Diggers won the EFAF Cup. During the tournament they played and defeated Wroclaw Giants (PL) and Prague Black Hawks (CZ) in the group stage, Amiens Spartiates (FR) in the semifinal and Triangle Razorbacks (DK) in the finale. The finale score being 31–21 and Danish QB Alexander Cimadon was named the games MVP.

Honours
 Mermaid Bowl - Danish Champions
 Winners : 2009, 2010
 Runner-up : 2008, 2011, 2012, 2015, 2017, 2021, 2022
 EFAF Cup
 Winners : 2012
 Junior Bowl - Danish U19 Champions
 Winners : 2011, 2016, 2018, 2019  
 Runner-up : 2010

Youth teams
Søllerød Gold Diggers has youth teams for five age groups, Under-19, Under-16, Under-14, Under-12 and Under-10.

Famous players

  WR Desi Barbour (2008–2009), formerly with UC Davis
  OL Mike Moffitt (2008–2009), formerly with Arkansas Razorbacks, Prague Panthers
  DL Ryan Shotwell (2010), formerly with Cal Poly Mustangs
  DL Ryan Ploesser (2011), formerly with Truman State Bulldogs
  DL Robert Shapel (2012–2014), formerly with Missouri State Bears
  QB Zach Shaw (2013), formerly with Wisconsin Lutheran College
  DE Dylan Drake (2014), formerly with Yale Bulldogs
  RB Robert Burton III (2017), formerly with Northwest Missouri State University
  DB Desmond Cooper (2017 & 2019), formerly with Jacksonville Jaguars
  WR Anthony Dimarsico (2018), formerly with New York Jets
  WR Griffin Norberg (2019), formerly with Valparaiso University
  QB Nick Rooney (2019), formerly with Adams State University
 OL Hjalte Froholdt, formerly with Arkansas Razorbacks and New England Patriots, currently with Cleveland Browns

External links
 

American football teams in Denmark
American football teams established in 2003
2003 establishments in Denmark